Paul Theodor van Brussel (1754–1795), was a Dutch flower painter.

He was born at Zuid-Polsbroek, near Schoonhoven, in 1754,  a scholar of Jean Augustin, and of Hendrik Meyer of Haarlem. He was first employed in the manufacture of tapestry, but afterwards devoted his attention entirely to nature, and became one of the best fruit and flower painters of his time. His later pictures are his best, and are to be found in some of the richest collections. He died at Amsterdam in 1795.

References
 

1754 births
1795 deaths
18th-century Dutch painters
18th-century Dutch male artists
Dutch male painters
Flower artists
People from Lopik